Aemala Manmadharaju Rajah, popularly known as A. M. Rajah, was an Indian playback singer and music director.

Early life
A. M. Rajah was born on 1 July 1929 in Cchamanchipuram, Chittoor District, Andhra Pradesh. His father died when he was three months old and the family moved to Renukapuram then Madras. He graduated Pachaiyappa's College with a Bachelor of Arts.

Early career
Whilst attending university, Rajah wrote, composed, and sang two songs in Telugu with the instrumental support of the music director K. V. Mahadevan for HMV. These songs were broadcast by All India Radio whereupon they caught the attention of S. S. Vasan. After listening to these songs, Vasan, with the approval of his music directors Emani Sankara Sastry, and Kalki Krishnamurthy, booked Rajah for his upcoming film, Samsaram. By this time Rajah was also recording songs for the films Rajambal and Kumaari (for M. G. Ramachandran).

His first Telugu film was Adarsham (1952). He also acted and sang in Pakkinti Ammayi (1953). His first song in Malayalam was for Lokaneethi (1952).

In 1953, Rajah and Jikki were chosen by Shankar Jaikishan and Raj Kapoor for the multilingual film Aah.

Rajah also sang in a few Sinhala films produced in Chennai and Sri Lanka with Jikki and K. Jamuna Rani.

Rajah's exit from the film world was controversial. He fell out with a number of music composers and developed a reputation for being difficult to work with. He was direct and had his own strong opinions about how songs must be composed and sung. Mahadevan was the first to openly drop him after recording the song "Kayile Inippathenna, Kaniyanal Kasappathenna", which was followed by a heated argument on the set of Manamulla Maru Tharam (1958). It was also known in the cinema circles that M. S. Viswanathan always resisted using Rajah in his films after their collaboration in Genoa. Film critics noted that he was his own worst enemy.

However, he continued to sing for Malayalam films longer where particularly G. Devarajan was able to coax Rajah to sing from time to time. Rajah however continued to reside in Chennai. It is noteworthy that G. Devarajan mentioned in his book that not only Rajah was an excellent melodious singer, but also of a straightforward character often misunderstood. Most composers called him an arrogant cynic.

Rajah made a comeback in the 1970s through composers V. Kumar and Shankar–Ganesh, and the songs were amongst the hits of the respective years.

Music composer
Rajah was booked early in his cinema life as one of the music composers, but he passed the opportunity to Viswanathan.

Rajah's debut as music composer was for Sobha (1958). It was C. V. Sridhar who gave his friend the second break to be a music director, fulfilling his promise that the day he directed his first film, Rajah would be its music director. The film was Kalyana Parisu (1959). Rajah received the Madras Film Fans Association award of Best Music Director in 1959 for this film. In the same year he composed music for Anbukkor Anni (1958). Sridhar and Rajah thereafter collaborated on Vidivelli (1960) and Then Nilavu (1961). They separated after the film was completed and Rajah refused to do the background music, but eventually did under pressure from mutual friends; Sridhar wanted to go back to Rajah for Nenjil Or Alayam (1962), but he refused. He then composed music for Aadi Perukku (1962).

In the 1970s, he composed music for films Amma Enna Stree(Malayalam-1970), Veetu Mapillai (Tamil-1973) and Enakkoru Magan Pirappan (Tamil-1975).

Death
On the 8th of April, 1989, Rajah was killed in a train accident at Valliyur. In transit to perform at a concert in Kanyakumari district temple, Rajah reportedly attempted to board a moving train, whereupon he tripped and fell onto the tracks. He was killed instantly.

Discography

References

 
 
 
 
 
 

1929 births
1989 deaths
Musicians from Andhra Pradesh
People from Chittoor district
20th-century Indian singers
Indian male playback singers
Telugu playback singers
Tamil playback singers
Malayalam playback singers
Kannada playback singers
Indian male composers
20th-century Indian male singers